Eaton v Allen is an early and precedent setting court case in the area of defamation.

The court found that in defamation the mere intent without an act is not punishable.

The court found that the defendants statement, "He is a brabler [sic], and a quarreller, for he gave his champion counsel to make a deed of gift of his goods, to kill me, and then to fly out of the country, but God preserved me." was nondefamatory.

The court also held it was non actionable to accuse a man of an impossible crime.

References

House of Lords cases
United Kingdom tort case law